Mariano Palacios Alcocer (born May 27, 1952, in Santiago de Querétaro) is a Mexican politician affiliated with the Institutional Revolutionary Party (PRI). 
He is a former governor of Querétaro and has presided twice over the PRI.

Mariano Palacios received a doctorate in law from the National Autonomous University of Mexico in 1995; he also holds both a bachelor's and a master's degree in law from the Autonomous University of Querétaro. He is married to Ana María González de Palacios, with whom he has seven children.

Political career
Palacios began his political career at the age of 21 when he became a Querétaro state deputy in the 54th legislature (1973–1976). He has been mayor of Santiago de Querétaro (1976–1979), senator for the State of Querétaro (1982–1985), Governor of Querétaro (1985–1991), federal congressman in the 57th Legislature (1997) and President of the National Executive Committee of the Revolutionary Institutional Party from 1997 until 1999 and again in 2005.

He has also been President of the Advisory Council of the Secretariat of Social Development (SEDESOL), Federal Attorney for Environmental Protection (1993–1994), Mexican Ambassador to Portugal (1995–1997), and Secretary of Labor (1999–2000) in President Ernesto Zedillo's cabinet.

See also
 List of presidents of Querétaro Municipality

References

1952 births
Living people
Governors of Querétaro
Members of the Senate of the Republic (Mexico)
Members of the Chamber of Deputies (Mexico)
Mexican Secretaries of Labor
People from Querétaro
Institutional Revolutionary Party politicians
Presidents of the Institutional Revolutionary Party
Ambassadors of Mexico to Portugal
20th-century Mexican politicians
21st-century Mexican politicians
National Autonomous University of Mexico alumni
Autonomous University of Queretaro alumni
Members of the Congress of Querétaro
Municipal presidents of Querétaro
20th-century Mexican lawyers
Ambassadors of Mexico to the Holy See
Mexican diplomats